Rechtsstaat (lit. "state of law"; "legal state") is a doctrine in continental European legal thinking, originating in Dutch and German jurisprudence.  It can be translated into English as "rule of law", alternatively "legal state", state of law, "state of justice", or "state based on justice and integrity". 

A Rechtsstaat is a constitutional state in which the exercise of governmental power is constrained by the law. It is closely related to "constitutionalism" while is often tied to the Anglo-American concept of the rule of law, but differs from it in also emphasizing what is just (i.e., a concept of moral rightness based on ethics, rationality, law, natural law, religion, or equity). Thus it is the opposite of Obrigkeitsstaat or Nichtrechtsstaat (a state based on the arbitrary use of power), and of Unrechtsstaat (a non-Rechtsstaat with the capacity to become one after a period of historical development).

In a Rechtsstaat, the power of the state is limited in order to protect citizens from the arbitrary exercise of authority. The citizens share legally based civil liberties and can use the courts. In continental European legal thinking, the Rechtsstaat is contrasted with both the police state and the État légal.

Immanuel Kant

German writers usually place the theories of German philosopher Immanuel Kant (1724–1804) at the beginning of their accounts of the movement toward the Rechtsstaat. Kant did not use the word Rechtsstaat, but contrasted an existing state (Staat) with an ideal, constitutional state (Republik).  His approach is based on the supremacy of a country's written constitution. This supremacy must create guarantees for implementation of his central idea: a permanent peaceful life as a basic condition for the happiness of its people and their prosperity. Kant proposed that this happiness be guaranteed by a moral constitution agreed on by the people and thus, under it, by moral government.

The actual expression Rechtsstaat appears to have been introduced by Carl Theodor Welcker in 1813, but it was popularised by Robert von Mohl's book Die deutsche Polizeiwissenschaft nach den Grundsätzen des Rechtsstaates ("German Policy Science according to the Principles of the Constitutional State"; 1832–33). Von Mohl contrasted government through policy with government, in a Kantian spirit, under general rules.

Principles of the Rechtsstaat

The most important principles of the Rechtsstaat are:

 The state is based on the supremacy of national constitution and guarantees the safety and constitutional rights of its citizens
 Civil society is an equal partner to the state
 Separation of powers, with the executive, legislative, and judiciary branches of government limiting one another's power and providing for checks and balances
 The judicature and the executive are bound by law (not acting against the law), and the legislature is bound by constitutional principles
 Both the legislature and democracy itself are bound by elementary constitutional rights and principles
 Transparency of state acts and the requirement of providing a reason for all state acts
 Review of state decisions and state acts by independent organs, including an appeal process
 Hierarchy of laws and the requirement of clarity and definiteness
 Reliability of state actions, protection of past dispositions made in good faith against later state actions, prohibition of retroactivity
 Principle of the proportionality of state action

Russian model of Rechtsstaat: a concept of the legal state
The Russian legal system, borne out of transformations in the 19th century under the reforms of Emperor Alexander II, is based primarily on the German legal tradition. It was from here that Russia borrowed a doctrine of Rechtsstaat, which literally translates as "legal state". The concept of "legal state" is a fundamental (but undefined) principle that appears in the very first dispositive provision of Russia's post-Communist constitution: "The Russian Federation – Russia – constitutes a democratic federative legal state with a republican form of governance." Similarly, the first dispositive provision of Ukraine's Constitution declares: "Ukraine is a sovereign and independent, democratic, social, legal state." The effort to give meaning to the expression "legal state" is anything but theoretical.

Valery Zorkin, President of the Constitutional Court of Russia, wrote in 2003:

The Russian concept of legal state adopted many elements of constitutional economics. Constitutional economics is a field of economics and constitutionalism that describes and analyzes the specific interrelationships between constitutional issues and functioning of the economy, including the budget process. The term "constitutional economics" was used by American economist James M. Buchanan as a name for a new academic sub-discipline that in 1986 brought him the Nobel Prize in Economic Sciences for his "development of the contractual and constitutional bases for the theory of economic and political decision-making." According to Buchanan, the ethic of constitutionalism is a key for constitutional order and "may be called the idealized Kantian world" where the individual "who is making the ordering, along with substantially all of his fellows, adopts the moral law as a general rule for behaviour". Buchanan rejects "any organic conception of the state as superior in wisdom, to the individuals who are its members." He believes that a constitution, intended for use by at least several generations of citizens, must be able to adjust itself for pragmatic economic decisions and to balance interests of the state and society against those of individuals and their constitutional rights to personal freedom and private happiness. The standards of constitutional economics when used during annual budget planning, as well as the latter's transparency to the civil society, are of primary importance to the implementation of the rule of law. Moreover, the availability of an effective court system, to be used by the civil society in situations of unfair government spending and executive impoundment of any previously authorized appropriations, becomes a key element for the success of any influential civil society. Some Russian researchers support an idea that, in the 21st century, the concept of the legal state has become not only a legal but also an economic concept, at least for Russia and many other transitional and developing countries.

See also
 Legal doctrine
 Philosophy of law
 Police state and État légal
 Political philosophy of Immanuel Kant
 Nuremberg Principles
 Radical right (Germany)

References

External links
Daniel R. Ernst – Ernst Freund, Felix Frankfurter and the American Rechtsstaat: A Transatlantic Shipwreck, 1894–1932. Georgetown Law Faculty Publications, October, 2009.
Matthias Koetter, Rechtsstaat and Rechtsstaatlichkeit in Germany (2010), Understandings of the Rule of Law in Various Legal Orders of the World, Wikis of the Free University Berlin, edited by Matthias Koetter and Folke Schuppert
Iain Stewart, "From 'Rule of Law' to 'Legal State':  a Time of Reincarnation?" (2007)
A. Anthony Smith: Kant's Political Philosophy: Rechtsstaat or Council Democracy? University of Notre Dame du Lac – 1985

Separation of powers
Philosophy of law
Theories of law
German words and phrases
Political terminology in Germany